USS LST-991 was an LST-542-class tank landing ship in the United States Navy. Like many of her class, she was not named and is properly referred to by her hull designation.

LST-991 was laid down on 26 February 1944 at the Boston Navy Yard; launched on 27 March 1944; sponsored by Dorothy Ann Govostes; and commissioned on 6 May 1944.

Service history
During World War II, LST-991 was assigned to the Pacific theater and participated in the following operations:
Capture and occupation of southern Palau Islands — September and October 1944
Leyte landings — October and November 1944
Lingayen Gulf landings — January 1945
Zambales-Subic Bay — January 1945
Assault and occupation of Okinawa Gunto — April through June 1945

Following the war, LST-991 performed occupation duty in the Far East and saw service in China. Decommissioned on 3 May 1946, at Shanghai, she was transferred to the U.S. Department of State for immediate transfer to the United Nations Relief and Rehabilitation Commission for service in Republic of China.

The ship is believed to have been torpedoed and sunk off of Quemoy Island by torpedo boats of the Chinese People's Liberation Army Navy.

LST-991 earned five battle stars for World War II service.

References
 
 

LST-542-class tank landing ships
Ships built in Boston
1944 ships
World War II amphibious warfare vessels of the United States
LST-542-class tank landing ships of the Republic of China Navy